Ivan Leko (born 7 February 1978) is a Croatian professional football manager and former player who is the manager of Croatian Football League club Hajduk Split.

Club career
Leko started his career with his hometown club Hajduk Split and played there for several seasons before moving to Spain to join Málaga CF. In his early senior years, he was loaned to HNK Trogir.

In January 2005, Leko returned for a brief stint with Hajduk; in the summer he joined Club Brugge.
On 15 January 2009, he decided to sign a contract for K.F.C. Germinal Beerschot. After his spell at the Antwerp side, he went on with his career at K.S.C. Lokeren.

International career
Leko made his debut for Croatia in a June 1999 Korea Cup match against Egypt, coming on as a 65th-minute substitute for Mario Cvitanović, and earned a total of 13 caps, scoring no goals. He was called up to the squad to participate in the 2006 World Cup, but played no part in the tournament, as Croatia exited in the group stage. His final international was a June 2006 friendly against Spain.

Managerial career
Leko made his debut as a manager in 2014, with Oud-Heverlee Leuven, but he managed club for a season.

In 2015 he became an assistant manager of Greek side PAOK FC under the coaching staff of Croatian manager Igor Tudor, who was sacked in 2016. A one-season, 2016–17, he managed Sint-Truidense V.V. and the next two seasons, 2017–18 and 2018–19, Leko was the manager of Club Brugge. He celebrated Jupiler Pro League and Belgian Super Cup in his first season in Brugge. Also, Leko won the title of Professional Manager of the Year. In October 2018 Belgian police interrogated him for corruption investigation.

In May 2019, Club Brugge KV and Leko parted ways. The 41-year-old coach had been with the club since 2017. On 1 June 2019, he was appointed at his new club, Al Ain. In December 2019, Leko left club Al Ain FC after a disastrous home defeat against Al Dhafra FC. Both sides had agreed to end their cooperation after five months of poor play.

On 20 May 2020, Leko was appointed the manager of Royal Antwerp. Taking over the team from Laszlo Bölöni, he led the team to win their first Belgian Cup since 1992, with a 1–0 win against his former side Club Brugge in the final. This earned Antwerp a qualification in the 2020–21 UEFA Europa League group stage for the first time in the club's history, where they were drawn in Group J against Tottenham Hotspur, LASK Linz and Ludogorets Razgrad. Leko led the team to a surprising 2nd place finish in the group, with 4 wins and 2 losses, culminating in a 1–0 home victory against Tottenham on 29 October; as a result, the team qualified for the round of 32, where they were drawn against Rangers. In December 2020, Leko left Royal Antwerp F.C. just before the UEFA Europa League match against Rangers and moved to Shanghai Port F.C., where he took up his new post with team Shanghai Port F.C., under a 2-year total net 5 million euros contract.

On 1 January 2021, Leko became the new manager of Chinese side Shanghai Port.

In February 2021, Leko was introduced as the new head coach of Shanghai Port F.C. at the SAIC Motor Pudong Arena.

Investigation
In October 2018, Club Brugge KV coach Leko was interrogated by Belgian police as part of a corruption investigation. 
In the subsequent court case, the judge demanded to know why Leko had received a payment from Dejan Veljkovic's Cypriot account in 2015. In June 2019, former Club Brugge KV coach Leko was interrogated all day as part of the investigation into fraud in Belgian football, but was later released.

Managerial statistics

Honours

Player
Hajduk Split
Prva HNL: 2000–01, 2004–05
Croatian Cup: 1999–2000

Málaga
UEFA Intertoto Cup: 2002

Club Brugge
Belgian Cup: 2006–07
Belgian Supercup: 2005

Lokeren
Belgian Cup: 2011–12

Manager
Club Brugge
Jupiler Pro League: 2017–18
Belgian Super Cup: 2018

Antwerp
Belgian Cup: 2019–20

Individual
Professional Manager of the Year: 2017–18

References

External links

1978 births
Living people
Footballers from Split, Croatia
Croatian footballers
Association football midfielders
Croatia youth international footballers
Croatia under-21 international footballers
Croatia international footballers
2006 FIFA World Cup players
HNK Hajduk Split players
HNK Trogir players
Málaga CF players
Club Brugge KV players
Beerschot A.C. players
K.S.C. Lokeren Oost-Vlaanderen players
Croatian Football League players
La Liga players
Belgian Pro League players
Croatian expatriate footballers
Expatriate footballers in Spain
Croatian expatriate sportspeople in Spain
Expatriate footballers in Belgium
Croatian expatriate sportspeople in Belgium
Croatian football managers
Oud-Heverlee Leuven managers
PAOK FC non-playing staff
Sint-Truidense V.V. managers
Club Brugge KV head coaches
Al Ain FC managers
Royal Antwerp F.C. managers
Shanghai Port F.C. managers
HNK Hajduk Split managers
UAE Pro League managers
Chinese Super League managers
Croatian Football League managers
Croatian expatriate football managers
Expatriate football managers in Belgium
Croatian expatriate sportspeople in Greece
Expatriate football managers in the United Arab Emirates
Croatian expatriate sportspeople in the United Arab Emirates
Expatriate football managers in China
Croatian expatriate sportspeople in China